Mustapha Jahhad Heron (born December 12, 1997) is an American professional basketball player for the Rio Grande Valley Vipers of the NBA G League. He is also contracted with the Manawatu Jets of the New Zealand National Basketball League (NZNBL). He played college basketball for the Auburn Tigers and the St. John's Red Storm.

Early life
Mustapha Heron was born on December 12, 1997, in Derby, Connecticut, to parents Thalia and Bryan Heron. He started playing basketball at the age of three. He has three sisters and one brother: Imani, Zari, Aja, and Raheem. Heron gained notoriety as an eighth grader after a video of him guarding NBA all-star Chris Paul one-on-one at the Five-Star Skills Clinic was posted to YouTube in 2011. The video has since been viewed over 2 million times.

High school career
Heron played his freshman year of high school at Wilbraham & Monson Academy before transferring to Sacred Heart High School, where he won three consecutive Connecticut state championships. He averaged 22.0 points per game and 5.3 rebounds per game as a junior at Sacred Heart, and 30.2 points per game and 8.0 rebounds per game during his senior season, including scoring 79 total points in the state semifinals and championship game. Heron was selected as the New Haven Register Connecticut Boys Basketball Player of the Year in both 2015 and 2016, becoming the first player to win the award twice since Kris Dunn. He was also recognized nationally, earning a spot on the USA Today All-USA Boys Basketball Third team in 2016. Heron was selected to play in the 2016 Ballislife All-American Game, where he was named co-MVP alongside Lonzo Ball.

Recruiting
Despite being initially committed to Pittsburgh, Heron committed to play basketball at Auburn University on August 16, 2015, and signed his National Letter of Intent to attend the university on November 12, 2015. In doing so, Heron became the first five-star men's basketball recruit to play at Auburn in program history.

College career
In his first season at Auburn, Heron scored in double figures in every game but one, leading the team in scoring with 15.2 points per game and rebounding with 6.1 rebounds per game. At the end of the season, he was named to the SEC All-Freshman team. He was also named to the SEC All-Community Service team for his work in encouraging academics for athletes at his high school, Sacred Heart High School, and in promoting a weapons buy-back program in his hometown of Waterbury, Connecticut.

Heron was selected as the SEC Men's Basketball Player of the Week for weeks 9 and 12 during his second season at Auburn. At the end of the regular season, Heron was selected to the AP All-SEC Second team. He averaged 16.4 points and 5.3 rebounds per game as a sophomore. On April 4, 2018, Heron declared for the 2018 NBA draft but did not hire an agent in order to maintain his amateur status. He announced that he was withdrawing from the draft but will transfer to be closer to his ailing mother in Connecticut. On May 31, Heron announced that he was transferring to St. John's and intended to seek a hardship waiver to play immediately. He was granted the waiver on October 13.

Heron averaged 14.6 points per game as a junior, shooting 40.3 percent from beyond the arc. He helped lead St. John's to its first NCAA Tournament since 2015. On February 11, 2020, Heron was ruled likely out for the season with an ankle injury.

Professional career
On February 26, 2021, Heron signed with the Leicester Riders of the British Basketball League for the rest of the 2020–21 season. In 20 games, he averaged 11.5 points, 4.2 rebounds and 1.1 assists per game.

For the 2021–22 season, Heron moved to Hungary to play for ZTE KK. In five games between September 25 and October 16, he averaged 9.2 points, 2.8 rebounds and 1.2 assists per game. In February 2022, he moved to Iceland to play for Keflavík. In 12 games, he averaged 16.4 points, 5.3 rebounds, 2.2 assists and 1.2 steals per game.

In October 2022, Heron joined the Rio Grande Valley Vipers of the NBA G League.

On March 1, 2023, Heron signed with the Manawatu Jets for the 2023 New Zealand NBL season.

National team career
In the summer of 2019, Heron was a part of the United States National team who competed at the Pan American Games in Peru. The team won bronze.

Career statistics

College

|-
| style="text-align:left;"| 2016–17
| style="text-align:left;"| Auburn
| 32 || 32 || 28.2 || .442 || .423 || .770 || 6.1 || 1.3 || .8 || .2 || 15.2
|-
| style="text-align:left;"| 2017–18
| style="text-align:left;"| Auburn
| 32 || 32 || 28.6 || .439 || .331 || .803 || 5.3 || .9 || 1.2 || .1 || 16.4
|-
| style="text-align:left;"| 2018–19
| style="text-align:left;"| St. John's
| 31 || 30 || 31.7 || .440 || .403 || .754 || 4.6 || 1.3 || 1.1 || .2 || 14.6
|-
| style="text-align:left;"| 2019–20
| style="text-align:left;"| St. John's
| 21 || 19 || 24.8 || .385 || .385 || .827 || 2.4 || 1.6 || .5 || .3 || 13.8
|- class="sortbottom"
| style="text-align:center;" colspan="2"| Career
| 116 || 113 || 28.6 || .430 || .383 || .785 || 4.8 || 1.3 || .9 || .2 || 15.1

References

External links
St. John's Red Storm bio
Auburn Tigers bio
USA Basketball bio
Icelandic Statistics at Icelandic Basketball Association

1997 births
Living people
African-American basketball players
American men's basketball players
Auburn Tigers men's basketball players
Basketball players at the 2019 Pan American Games
Basketball players from Connecticut
Keflavík men's basketball players
Leicester Riders players
Rio Grande Valley Vipers players
Pan American Games bronze medalists for the United States
Pan American Games medalists in basketball
Shooting guards
Sportspeople from Waterbury, Connecticut
St. John's Red Storm men's basketball players
ZTE KK players
Medalists at the 2019 Pan American Games
21st-century African-American sportspeople